Charles D. Stone (April 11, 1920 – April 16, 1992) was a former Democratic member of the Pennsylvania House of Representatives.

References

Democratic Party members of the Pennsylvania House of Representatives
1992 deaths
1920 births
20th-century American politicians